Eugenia Raskopoulos (born 1959) is a contemporary artist notable for her photographic and video work critiquing language, processes of translation, and the body. Raskopoulos' work has been shown in numerous Australian and International exhibitions, and was the winner of the Josephine Ulrick and Win Schubert Award for her work Vestiges #3, 2010.

Raskopoulos was born in the Czech Republic. She migrated back to Greece in 1959 with her family, then to Australia in 1963.

Solo exhibitions 
 Arc One Gallery 
 Art Gallery of New South Wales 
 Australian Centre for Photography
 Artspace
 Casula Powerhouse Arts Centre
 UQ Art Museum
 Art Beijing, China
 William Wright Artists Projects
 Darklight Photography Gallery

Awards 
Josephine Ulrick and Win Schubert Award, 2012.
MoMA scholarship for The Feminist Future conference from the Museum of Modern Art in New York.

Publications 
Art Collector magazine: "Standout Exhibitions" by Daniel Mudie Cunningham.

References 

1959 births
Living people
Australian women artists